The 106th United States Congress began on January 3, 1999. There were eight new senators (four Democrats, four Republicans) and 40 new representatives (23 Democrats, 17 Republicans) at the start of the first session. Additionally, two senators (one Democrat, one Republican) and three representatives (one Democrat, two Republicans) took office on various dates in order to fill vacancies during the 106th Congress before it ended on January 3, 2001.

Senate

Took office January 3, 1999

Took office during the 106th Congress

House of Representatives

Took office January 3, 1999

Took office during the 106th Congress

See also 
List of United States senators in the 106th Congress
List of members of the United States House of Representatives in the 106th Congress by seniority

Notes

106th United States Congress
106